Ferdinand Exl (1875–1942) was an Austrian stage and film actor. He was married to the actress Anna Exl, with whom they had a daughter Ilse Exl who also took up acting.

Selected filmography
 The Fire Devil (1940)

References

Bibliography
 W. E. Yates. Theatre in Vienna: A Critical History, 1776-1995. Cambridge University Press, 2005.

External links

1875 births
1942 deaths
Actors from Innsbruck
People from the County of Tyrol
Austrian male film actors
Austrian male stage actors